Urosalpinx archipatagonica is an extinct species of sea snail, a marine gastropod mollusk in the family Muricidae, the murex snails or rock snails.

Description

Distribution
Fossils were found in Miocene strata of Argentina (age range: 23.03 to 15.97 Ma).

References

 H. Ihering. 1907. Les Mollusques fossiles du Tertiare et du Crétacé supérieur de l' Argentine. Anales Museo Nacional de Buenos Aires 15(3):1-611

External links
 WMSDB: Urosalpinx archipatagonica

archipatagonica